Jeong On-ra (born 19 May 1982) is a South Korean freestyle swimmer. She competed in three events at the 1996 Summer Olympics.

References

External links
 

1982 births
Living people
South Korean female freestyle swimmers
Olympic swimmers of South Korea
Swimmers at the 1996 Summer Olympics
Place of birth missing (living people)